John Milner (born 14 May 1942 in Huddersfield) is an English former professional footballer who played in the Football League as a wing half for Huddersfield Town, Lincoln City and Bradford Park Avenue during the 1960s.

He also played in the North American Soccer League for the Boston Beacons and the Denver Dynamos.

References

External links
 League stats at Neil Brown's site

1942 births
Living people
Footballers from Huddersfield
English footballers
Association football midfielders
Huddersfield Town A.F.C. players
Lincoln City F.C. players
Bradford (Park Avenue) A.F.C. players
Boston Beacons players
Denver Dynamos players
English Football League players
North American Soccer League (1968–1984) players
English expatriate sportspeople in the United States
Expatriate soccer players in the United States
English expatriate footballers